Ardekania sefidella is a species of snout moth in the genus Ardekania. It was described by Hans Georg Amsel in 1954 and is known from Iran.

References

Moths described in 1954
Anerastiini
Moths of Asia
Taxa named by Hans Georg Amsel